Rac1, also known as Ras-related C3 botulinum toxin substrate 1, is a protein found in human cells. It is encoded by the RAC1 gene. This gene can produce a variety of alternatively spliced versions of the Rac1 protein, which appear to carry out different functions.

Function 

Rac1 is a small (~21 kDa) signaling G protein (more specifically a GTPase), and is a member of the Rac subfamily of the family Rho family of GTPases. Members of this superfamily appear to regulate a diverse array of cellular events, including the control of GLUT4 translocation to glucose uptake, cell growth, cytoskeletal reorganization, antimicrobial cytotoxicity, and the activation of protein kinases.

Rac1 is a pleiotropic regulator of many cellular processes, including the cell cycle, cell-cell adhesion, motility (through the actin network), and of epithelial differentiation (proposed to be necessary for maintaining epidermal stem cells).

Role in cancer 

Along with other subfamily of Rac and Rho proteins, they exert an important regulatory role specifically in cell motility and cell growth. Rac1 has ubiquitous tissue expression, and drives cell motility by formation of lamellipodia. In order for cancer cells to grow and invade local and distant tissues, deregulation of cell motility is one of the hallmark events in cancer cell invasion and metastasis. Overexpression of a constitutively active Rac1 V12 in mice caused a tumor that's phenotypically indistinguishable from human Kaposi's sarcoma. Activating or gain-of-function mutations of Rac1 are shown to play active roles in promoting mesenchymal-type of cell movement assisted by NEDD9 and DOCK3 protein complex. Such abnormal cell motility may result in epithelial mesenchymal transition (EMT) – a driving mechanism for tumor metastasis as well as drug-resistant tumor relapse.

Role in glucose transport

Rac1 is expressed in significant amounts in insulin sensitive tissues, such as adipose tissue and skeletal muscle. Here Rac1 regulated the translocation of glucose transporting GLUT4 vesicles from intracellular compartments to the plasma membrane. In response to insulin, this allows for blood glucose to enter the cell to lower blood glucose. In conditions of obesity and type 2 diabetes, Rac1 signaling in skeletal muscle is dysfunctional, suggesting that Rac1 contributes to the progression of the disease. 
Rac1 protein is also necessary for glucose uptake in skeletal muscle activated by exercise  and muscle stretching

Clinical significance 

Activating mutations in Rac1 have been recently discovered in large-scale genomic studies involving melanoma and non-small cell lung cancer. As a result, Rac1 is considered a therapeutic target for many of these diseases.

A few recent studies have also exploited targeted therapy to suppress tumor growth by pharmacological inhibition of Rac1 activity in metastatic melanoma and liver cancer as well as in human breast cancer.
For example, Rac1-dependent pathway inhibition resulted in the reversal of tumor cell phenotypes, suggesting Rac1 as a predictive marker and therapeutic target for trastuzumab-resistant breast cancer. However, given Rac1's role in glucose transport, drugs that inhibits Rac1 could potentially be harmful to glucose homeostasis.

Dominant negative or constitutively active germline RAC1 mutations cause diverse phenotypes that have been grouped together as Mental Retardation Type 48. Most mutations cause microcephaly while some specific changes appear to result in macrocephaly.

Interactions 

RAC1 has been shown to interact with:

 ARFIP2,
 ARHGDIA,
 BAIAP2,
 FHOD1,
 FMNL1,
 IQGAP1,
 IQGAP2,
 Myd88,
 DMPK,
 NCKAP1,
 PAK1,
 PAK3,
 PARD6A,
 PARD6B,
 RICS
 STAT3,  and
 TIAM1.

References

Further reading

External links 
 
RAC1 Info with links in the Cell Migration Gateway